Macfarlandia arachnoides is a species of beetles in the family Cicindelidae, the only species in the genus Macfarlandia.

References

Cicindelidae
Monotypic Adephaga genera